Astrothelium megaeneum is a species of corticolous (bark-dwelling) lichen in the family Trypetheliaceae. Found in Bolivia, it was formally described as a new species in 2016 by lichenologists Adam Flakus and André Aptroot. It is only known to occur at the type locality. The species epithet megaeneum refers to both its characteristic large ascomata and ascospores, and its similarity to Astrothelium aeneum.

References

megaeneum
Lichen species
Lichens described in 2016
Lichens of Bolivia
Taxa named by André Aptroot
Taxa named by Adam Grzegorz Flakus